James Griffith (1916–1993) was an American character actor, musician and screenwriter.

James Griffith may also refer to:
James Griffith (academic) (1761–1821), English academic and administrator
James Bray Griffith (1871–1937), American business theorist
James Milo Griffith (1843–1897), Welsh sculptor
Jim Griffith, folklorist who won a 2011 National Heritage Fellowship

See also
James Griffiths (disambiguation)
James Griffyth Fairfax British poet, translator, and politician